South African Schools Act NO. 84 is established by the government of  South Africa on 15 November, 1996.

The Act is to create and provide for a uniform system for the organizations, governance and funding of the country's schools. It is structured into seven chapters on the structure of schools, their funding, the organization of the different types of schools and the structure of the educational process. Schools are classified into primary or secondary. Both types of schools are further classified into five and four types, respectively.

The law makes primary education compulsory for all children from the age of seven.

See also
Education in South Africa

References

Schools in South Africa
Education in South Africa